A multiple birth is the culmination of one multiple pregnancy, wherein the mother gives birth to two or more babies. A term most applicable to vertebrate species, multiple births occur in most kinds of mammals, with varying frequencies. Such births are often named according to the number of offspring, as in twins and triplets. In non-humans, the whole group may also be referred to as a litter, and multiple births may be more common than single births. Multiple births in humans are the exception and can be exceptionally rare in the largest mammals.

A multiple pregnancy may be the result of the fertilization of a single egg that then splits to create identical fetuses, or it may be the result of the fertilization of multiple eggs that create fraternal ("non-identical") fetuses, or it may be a combination of these factors.  A multiple pregnancy from a single zygote is called monozygotic, from two zygotes is called dizygotic, or from three or more zygotes is called polyzygotic. 
Similarly, the siblings themselves from a multiple birth may be referred to as monozygotic if they are identical or as dizygotic (in cases of twins) or polyzygotic (for three or more siblings) if they are fraternal, i.e., non-identical.

Each fertilized ovum (zygote) may produce a single embryo, or it may split into two or more embryos, each carrying the same genetic material. Fetuses resulting from different zygotes are called fraternal and share only 50% of their genetic material, as ordinary full siblings from separate births do. Fetuses resulting from the same zygote share 100% of their genetic material and hence are called identical. Identical twins are always the same sex.

Terminology

Terms used for the number of offspring in a multiple birth, where a number higher than three ends with the suffix -uplet:
two offspring – twins
three offspring – triplets
four offspring – quadruplets
five offspring – quintuplets
six offspring – sextuplets
seven offspring – septuplets
eight offspring – octuplets
nine offspring – nonuplets
ten offspring – decuplets

Terms used for multiple births or the genetic relationships of their offspring are based on the zygosity of the pregnancy:
 Monozygotic – multiple (typically two) fetuses produced by the splitting of a single zygote
 Polyzygotic – multiple fetuses produced by two or more zygotes:
 Dizygotic – multiple (typically two) fetuses produced by two zygotes
 Trizygotic – three or more fetuses produced by three zygotes
 Sesquizygotic – an egg which is fertilized by 2 sperms, which produce 2 fetuses

Multiple pregnancies are also classified by how the fetuses are surrounded by one or more placentas (chorionicity) and amniotic sacs (amnionicity).

Human multiple births
In humans, the average length of pregnancy (two weeks fewer than gestation) is 38 weeks with a single fetus. This average decreases for each additional fetus: to thirty-six weeks for twin births, thirty-two weeks for triplets, and thirty weeks for quadruplets. With the decreasing gestation time, the risks from immaturity at birth and subsequent viability increase with the size of the sibling group. Only as of the twentieth century have more than four all survived infancy.

Recent history has also seen increasing numbers of multiple births. In the United States, it has been estimated that by 2011, 36% of twin births and 78% of triplet and higher-order births resulted from conception by assisted reproductive technology.

Twins

Twins are by far the most common form of multiple births in humans. The U.S. Centers for Disease Control and Prevention report more than 132,000 sets of twins out of 3.9 million births of all kinds each year, about 3.4%, or 1 in 30. Without fertility treatments, the probability is about 1 in 60; with fertility treatments, it can be as high as 20-25%.

Dizygotic (fraternal) twins run in families; however, the man does not influence the chances of the woman having twins, even if there are twins in his family. The hyperovulation gene is the cause for having twins and is only a factor for the mother. Although the man does not influence the woman's chances of having twins, he could influence his children's chances for having twins; if he carries the gene for hyperovulation and has a daughter, she may also have the gene for hyperovulation and then have twins herself.

Monozygotic (identical) twins do not run in families. The twinning is random, due to the egg splitting, so all parents have an equal chance of conceiving identical twins.

Triplets

Triplets can be either fraternal, identical, or a combination of both. The most common are strictly fraternal triplets, which come from a polyzygotic pregnancy of three eggs. Less common are triplets from a dizygotic pregnancy, where one zygote divides into two identical fetuses, and the other does not. Least common are identical triplets, three fetuses from one egg. In this case, the original zygote divides into two and then one of those two zygotes divides again but the other does not.

Triplets are far less common than twins, according to the U.S. Centers for Disease Control and Prevention, accounting for only about 4300 sets in 3.9 million births, just a little more than 0.1%, or 1 in 1000. According to the American Society of Reproductive Medicine, only about 10% of these are identical triplets: about 1 in ten thousand. Nevertheless, only 4 sets of identical triplets were reported in the U.S. during 2015, about one in a million. According to Victor Khouzami, Chairman of Obstetrics at Greater Baltimore Medical Center, "No one really knows the incidence".

Identical triplets or quadruplets are very rare and result when the original fertilized egg splits and then one of the resultant cells splits again (for triplets) or, even more rarely, a further split occurs (for quadruplets). The odds of having identical triplets is unclear. News articles and other non-scientific organizations give odds from one in 60,000 to one in 200 million pregnancies.

Quadruplets
Quadruplets are much rarer than twins or triplets. As of 2007, there were approximately 3,556 sets recorded worldwide. Quadruplet births are becoming increasingly common due to fertility treatments. There are around 70 sets of all-identical quadruplets worldwide. Many sets of quadruplets contain a mixture of identical and fraternal siblings, such as three identical and one fraternal, two identical and two fraternal, or two pairs of identicals. One famous set of identical quadruplets was the Genain quadruplets, all of whom developed schizophrenia.  Quadruplets are sometimes referred to as "quads" in Britain.

Quintuplets

Quintuplets occur naturally in 1 in 55,000,000 births. The first quintuplets known to survive infancy were the identical female Canadian Dionne Quintuplets, born in 1934. Quintuplets are sometimes referred to as "quins" in the UK and "quints" in North America. A famous set of all-girl quintuplets are the Busby quints from the TV series OutDaughtered.

Sextuplets

Born in Liverpool, England, on 18 November 1983, the Walton sextuplets were the world's first all-female surviving sextuplets, and the world's fourth known set of surviving sextuplets. Another well-known set of sextuplets is the Gosselin sextuplets, born on May 10, 2004, in Hershey, Pennsylvania. Reality television shows Jon & Kate Plus 8 and later Kate Plus 8 have chronicled the lives of these sextuplets. Other shows of this nature include Table for 12 and Sweet Home Sextuplets.

Very high-order multiple births
In 1997, the McCaughey septuplets, born in Des Moines, Iowa, became the first septuplets known to survive infancy. Multiple births of as many as eight babies have been born alive, the first surviving set on record goes to the Suleman octuplets, born in 2009 in Bellflower, California. , all of them were alive and turned 10 years old. In May 2021, the Cissé nonuplets were born in Morocco to Halima Cissé, a 25-year-old woman from Mali. , one year since their births, all nine are still living and reportedly in good health.

The list of multiple births covers notable examples.

Causes and frequency

The frequency of N multiple births from natural pregnancies has been given as approximately 1:89N−1 (Hellin's law) and as about 1:80N−1. This gives:
1:89 (= 1.1%) or 1:80 (= 1.25%) for twins
1:892 (= 1:7921, about 0.013%) or 1:802 (= 1:6400) for triplets
1:893 (= approx. 0.000142%, less than 1:700,000) or 1:803 for quadruplets

North American dizygotic twinning occurs about once in 83 conceptions, and triplets about once in 8000 conceptions. US figures for 2010 were:
 Twins, 132,562, 3.31%
 Triplets, 5,503, 0.14%
 Quadruplets, 313, 0.0078%
 Quintuplets and more, 37, 0.00092%

Human multiple births can occur either naturally (the woman ovulates multiple eggs or the fertilized egg splits into two) or as the result of infertility treatments such as in vitro fertilization (several embryos are often transferred to compensate for lower quality) or fertility drugs (which can cause multiple eggs to mature in one ovulatory cycle).

For reasons that are not yet known, the older a woman is, the more likely she is to have a multiple birth naturally. It is theorized that this is due to the higher level of follicle-stimulating hormone that older women sometimes have as their ovaries respond more slowly to FSH stimulation.

The number of multiple births has increased over the last decade. For example, in Canada between 1979 and 1999, the number of multiple birth babies increased 35%. Before the advent of ovulation-stimulating drugs, triplets were quite rare (approximately 1 in 8000 births) and higher-order births much rarer still. Much of the increase can probably be attributed to the impact of fertility treatments, such as in-vitro fertilization. Younger patients who undergo treatment with fertility medication containing artificial FSH, followed by intrauterine insemination, are particularly at risk for multiple births of higher order.

Certain factors appear to increase the likelihood that a woman will naturally conceive multiples. These include:
mother's age: women over 35 are more likely to have multiples than younger women
mother's use of fertility drugs: approximately 35% of pregnancies arising through the use of fertility treatments such as IVF involve more than one child

The increasing use of fertility drugs and consequent increased rate of multiple births has made the phenomenon of multiples more frequent and hence more visible. In 2004 the birth of sextuplets, six children, to Pennsylvania couple Kate and Jon Gosselin helped them to launch their television series, originally Jon & Kate Plus 8 and (following their divorce) Kate Plus 8, which became the highest-rated show on the TLC network.

Risks

Premature birth and low birth weight
Babies born from multiple-birth pregnancies are much more likely to result in premature birth than those from single pregnancies. 51% of twins and 91% of triplets are born preterm, compared to 9.4% in singletons. 14% of twins and 41% of triplets are even born very preterm, compared to 1.7% in singletons.

Drugs known as betamimetics can be used to relax the muscles of the uterus and delay birth in singleton pregnancies. There is some evidence that these drugs can also reduce the risk of preterm birth for twin pregnancies, but existing studies are small. More data is required before solid conclusions can be drawn. Likewise, existing studies are too small to determine if a cervical suture is effective for reducing prematurity in cases of multiple birth.

As a result of preterm birth, multiples tend to have lower birth weight than singletons. Exceptions are possible, however, as with the Kupresak triplets, born in 2008 in Mississauga, Ontario, Canada. Their combined weight was 17 lbs, 2.7 oz, which set a world record. Two of the triplets were similar in size and, as expected, moderately low birth weight. The two combined weighed 9 lbs, 2.7 oz. The third triplet, however, was much larger and weighed 8 lbs. individually.

Cerebral palsy
Cerebral palsy is more common among multiple births than single births, being 2.3 per 1,000 survivors in singletons, 13 in twins, and 45 in triplets in North West England. This is likely a side effect of premature birth and low birth weight.

Incomplete separation

Multiples may be monochorionic, sharing the same chorion, with resultant risk of twin-to-twin transfusion syndrome. Monochorionic multiples may even be monoamniotic, sharing the same amniotic sac, resulting in risk of umbilical cord compression and nuchal cord. In very rare cases, there may be conjoined twins, possibly impairing function of internal organs.

Mortality rate (stillbirth)
Multiples are also known to have a higher mortality rate.  It is more common for multiple births to be stillborn, while for singletons the risk is not as high.  A literary review on multiple pregnancies shows a study done on one set each of septuplets and octuplets, two sets of sextuplets, 8 sets of quintuplets, 17 sets of quadruplets, and 228 sets of triplets.  By doing this study, Hammond found that the mean gestational age (how many weeks when birthed) at birth was 33.4 weeks for triplets and 31 weeks for quadruplets. This shows that stillbirth happens usually 3–5 weeks before the woman reaches full term and also that for sextuplets or higher it almost always ends in death of the fetuses.
Though multiples are at a greater risk of being stillborn, there is inconclusive evidence whether the actual mortality rate is higher in multiples than in singletons.

Prevention in IVF
Today many multiple pregnancies are the result of in vitro fertilisation (IVF). In a 1997 study of 2,173 embryo transfers performed as part of in vitro fertilisation (IVF), 34% were successfully delivered pregnancies. The overall multiple pregnancy rate was 31.3% (24.7% twins, 5.8% triplets, and .08% quadruplets). Because IVFs are producing more multiples, a number of efforts are being made to reduce the risk of multiple births- specifically triplets or more. Medical practitioners are doing this by limiting the number of embryos per embryo transfer to one or two. That way, the risks for the mother and fetuses are decreased.

The appropriate number of embryos to be transferred depends on the age of the woman, whether it is the first, second or third full IVF cycle attempt and whether there are top-quality embryos available. According to a guideline from The National Institute for Health and Care Excellence (NICE) in 2013, the number of embryos transferred in a cycle should be chosen as in following table:

Also, it is recommended to use single embryo transfer in all situations if a top-quality blastocyst is available.

Management
Bed rest has not been found to change outcomes and therefore is not generally recommended outside of a research study.

Selective reduction (procedure)
Selective reduction is the practice of reducing the number of fetuses in a multiple pregnancy; it is also called "multifetal reduction".

The procedure generally takes two days; the first day for testing in order to select which fetuses to remove, and the second day for the procedure itself, in which potassium chloride is injected into the heart of each selected fetus under the guidance of ultrasound imaging.  Risks of the procedure include bleeding requiring transfusion, rupture of the uterus, retained placenta, infection, a miscarriage, and prelabor rupture of membranes. Each of these appears to be rare. There are also ethical concerns about this procedure, since it is a form of abortion, and also because of concerns over which fetuses are terminated and why.

Selective reduction was developed in the mid-1980s, as people in the field of assisted reproductive technology became aware of the risks that multiple pregnancies carried for the mother and for the fetuses.

Care in pregnancy
Women with a multiple pregnancy are usually seen more regularly by midwives or doctors than those with singleton pregnancies because of the higher risks of complications. However, there is currently no evidence to suggest that specialised antenatal services produce better outcomes for mother or babies than ‘normal’ antenatal care.

Nutrition
As preterm birth is such a risk for women with multiple pregnancies, it has been suggested that these women should be encouraged to follow a high-calorie diet to increase the birth weights of the babies. Evidence around this subject is not yet good enough to advise women to do this because the long term effects of the high-calorie diets on the mother are not known.

Cesarean section or vaginal delivery
A study in 2013 involving 106 participating centers in 25 countries came to the conclusion that, in a twin pregnancy of a gestational age between 32 weeks 0 days and 38 weeks 6 days, and the first twin is in cephalic presentation, planned Cesarean section does not significantly decrease or increase the risk of fetal or neonatal death or serious neonatal disability, as compared with planned vaginal delivery. In this study, 44% of the women planned for vaginal delivery still ended up having Cesarean section for unplanned reasons such as pregnancy complications. In comparison, it has been estimated that 75% of twin pregnancies in the United States were delivered by Cesarean section in 2008. Also in comparison, the rate of Cesarean section for all pregnancies in the general population varies between 40% and 14%.

Fetal position (the way the babies are lying in the womb) usually determines if they are delivered by caesarean section or vaginally. A review of good quality research on this subject found that if the twin that will be born first (i.e. is lowest in the womb) is head down there is no good evidence that caesarean section will be safer than a vaginal birth for the mother or babies.

Monoamniotic twins (twins that form after the splitting of a fertilised egg and share the same amniotic fluid sac) are at more risk of complications than twins that have their own sacs. There is also insufficient evidence around whether to deliver the babies early by caesarean section or to wait for labour to start naturally while running checks on the babies’ wellbeing. The birth of this type of twins should therefore be decided with the mother and her family and should take into account the need for good neonatal care services.

Cesarean delivery is needed when first twin is in non cephalic presentation or when it is a monoamniotic twin pregnancy.

Neonatal intensive care
Multiple-birth infants are usually admitted to neonatal intensive care immediately after being born. The records for all the triplet pregnancies managed and delivered from 1992 to 1996 were looked over to see what the neonatal statistics were.  Kaufman found from reviewing these files that during a five-year period, 55 triplet pregnancies, which is 165 babies, were delivered.  Of the 165 babies 149 were admitted to neonatal intensive care after the delivery.

Society and culture

Insurance coverage

United States
A study by the U.S. Agency for Healthcare Research and Quality found that, in 2011, pregnant women covered by private insurance in the United States were older and more likely to have multiple gestation than women covered by Medicaid.

Cultural aspects
Certain cultures consider multiple births a portent of either good or evil.

Mayan culture saw twins as a blessing, and was fascinated by the idea of two bodies looking alike. The Mayans used to believe that twins were one soul that had fragmented.

In Ancient Rome, the legend of the twin brothers who founded the city (Romulus and Remus) made the birth of twin boys a blessing, while twin girls were seen as an unlucky burden, since both would have to be provided with an expensive dowry at about the same time.

In Greek mythology, fraternal twins Castor and Polydeuces, and Heracles and Iphicles, are sons of two different fathers. One of the twins (Polydeuces, Heracles) is the illegitimate son of the god Zeus; his brother is the son of their mother's mortal husband. A similar pair of twin sisters are Helen (of Troy) and Clytemnestra (who are also sisters of Castor and Polydeuces). The theme occurs in other mythologies as well, and is called superfecundation.

In certain medieval European chivalric romances, such as Marie de France's Le Fresne, a woman cites a multiple birth (often to a lower-class woman) as proof of adultery on her part; while this may reflect a widespread belief, it is invariably treated as malicious slander, to be justly punished by the accuser having a multiple birth of her own, and the events of the romance are triggered by her attempt to hide one or more of the children.  A similar effect occurs in the Knight of the Swan romance, in the Beatrix variants of the Swan-Children; her taunt is punished by giving birth to seven children at once, and her wicked mother-in-law returns her taunt before exposing the children.

Ethics of multiple births

Medically assisted procreation
In vitro fertilization: In vitro fertilization (IVF) was first successfully completed in the 1970s as a form of assisted reproductive technology. Out of all the assisted reproductive technology available that is currently in practice, in vitro fertilization has the highest chance of producing multiple offspring. Per each female egg, IVF currently has a 60-70% chance of conceiving. Fertilization is made possible by administering a fertility drug to the eggs or by directly injecting semen into the eggs. There is an increased chance for women over the age of 35 to have multiple births. IVF is a common genetic and ethical topic. Through IVF individuals can produce offspring successfully when natural procreation is not viable. However, in vitro can become genetically specific and allow for the selection of particular genes or expressible traits to be dominantly present in the formed embryo. Ethical dilemmas arise when determining health care coverage and the deviation from natural selection and gene variations. In regards to multiple births different ethical concerns arise from the use of in vitro fertilization. Overall, multiple pregnancies can cause potential harm to the mother and children due to potential complications. Such complications can include uterine bleeding and children not receiving equal nutrients. IVF has also revealed some pre term deliveries and lower birth weights in babies. While some view medically assisted procreation as a saving grace to have children, others consider these procedure to be unnatural and costly to the community.

Multifetal pregnancy reduction
Multifetal pregnancy reduction is the reduction of one or more embryos from the bearing woman. Selective reduction usually occurs for pregnancies assisted by assisted reproductive technology (ART). The first multifetal pregnancy reductions to occur in a clinical setting took place in the 1980s. The procedure aims to reduce pregnancies down to approximately one to two fetuses. The overarching purpose of the procedure is not primarily to simply terminate life, but to increase the survival and success of the mother and babies. However, multifetal pregnancy reduction raises some ethical questions. The main argument is similar to abortion ethics (Abortion debate) in reduction of fetus versus fetus life. The protection of maternal well being versus harm of newly formed fetal life is an extension of the aforementioned ethical question. It can be viewed that all life is important and that no life should be terminated without consent from the life that is being terminated. A polar opposite viewpoint advocates for the right of choice, that being the choice to terminate a pregnancy due to desire or pregnancy risks. Overall, most multifetal pregnancy reductions that occur as a result of ART are being done for the protection of the child-bearer's health and to maximize the health of the remaining fetuses.

See also
 Biological reproduction
 Conjoined twins
 Feodor Vassilyev
 "Grávida de Taubaté" (pt), a Brazilian woman who pretended to be pregnant with quadruplets in 2012 and gained national media attention before her pregnancy was revealed to be a hoax
 Half a Dozen Babies, a 1999 drama film about the 1993-born Dilley sextuplets
 List of multiple births
 List of twins
 Only child
 Quints, a Disney Channel movie about a teenage girl becoming the older sister to quintuplets
 Superfecundation (multiple pregnancy resulting from separate acts of sexual intercourse)
 Three Identical Strangers 
 Twin

References

External links

 Facts About Multiples
 HFEA consultation on multiple births after IVF
 D. L. Ashliman, Multiple Births in Legend and Folklore
 Twins and Multiple Births Association

 
Sibling
Zoology
Women's health